RDW, or rdw, may refer to:

RDW (Dienst Wegverkeer), the organization that administers vehicle registration and driving licences in the Netherlands
Red blood cell distribution width, a parameter reported in blood tests
Reading West railway station (National Rail code), Berkshire, UK
Red Wing station (Amtrak code), Minnesota, US
Redrow plc (London Stock Exchange code), British housebuilder

See also
Wier RDW-2 Draggin' Fly, American light aircraft